Diamante Medaglia Faini (28 August 1724 – 13 June 1770) was an Italian poet. She was a member of the academies Accademia degli Agiati (1751), Accademia degli Orditi in Padua, under the name Nisea Corcirense, and Accademia dell'Arcadia in Rome (1757). She was known for her love poems, and  also composed sonnets and madrigals.

She was the daughter of the doctor Antonio Medaglia, and married the doctor Pietro Antonio Faini in 1748. Her father arranged the marriage because he disliked her fame, and the marriage forced her to stop using love as a theme of her poems. She was a controversial poet, and stopped her activity in the academies when they tried to force her to adjust herself to accepted convention. She died during her studies in philosophy, history, French and science.

References

Sources

1724 births
1770 deaths
18th-century Italian women writers
18th-century Italian poets
Italian women poets